Bankstown Girls High School is a government-funded single-sex comprehensive secondary day school for girls, located in Bankstown, a south-western suburb of Sydney, New South Wales, Australia.

Established in 1959, the school enrolled approximately 550 students in 2018, from Year 7 to Year 12, of whom less than one percent identified as Indigenous Australians and 97 percent were from a language background other than English. The school is operated by the NSW Department of Education in accordance with a curriculum developed by the New South Wales Education Standards Authority.

Overview 
The school was established in 1959. Smart boards are used in certain classrooms to complement the education.

Houses 
Students are allocated to a house when they enter BGHS according to their surnames. There are four houses which students compete under for the Swimming, Athletics and Cross Country Carnivals:

 Freeman – Red
 Sauvage – Blue
 Jackson – Green
 O'Neil – Yellow

The house names were formed in 2001 by the SRC.

Extracurricular activity 
The BGHS has a Student Representative Council, as well as prefects, and a newsletter called the Buzz.

Students have the option to participate in athletics, sporting teams, debating, public speaking, student ambassador programs, math competitions, science competitions, anime club, dance and choir. Since 2010, Bankstown Girls High School has held a school event called Dance Revolution where the students perform numerous dance numbers.

Notable alumnae
Paulini CuruenavuliR&B singer and former Australian Idol contestant and Young Divas member
Mary FowlerAustralian soccer player

See also 

 List of government schools in New South Wales
 List of girls' schools in New South Wales
 Education in Australia

References

External links 
 

Educational institutions established in 1959
Public high schools in Sydney
Girls' schools in New South Wales
Bankstown, New South Wales
1959 establishments in Australia